The Archbach, also called Planseeache, is a river of Tyrol, Austria.

It arises from the lake Plansee in Breitenwang. It flows northeastward to Reutte and furtheron to Pflach where it discharges into the Lech.

References

Rivers of Tyrol (state)
Ammergau Alps
Rivers of Austria